Grad (trans. The City) is an EP released by Serbian rock band Cactus Jack in 2002.

Grad is the band's second release, following their 2002 debut release, the live/cover album DisCover, and is the band's frist release to feature their own material. Besides three tracks, the EP features the video for the track "Nekada" ("Some Time Ago") as a bonus.

The EP cover was designed by Dragoljub "Paja" Bogdanović, who appeared on the band's previous release as guest vocalist and would in 2015 become Cactus Jack's frontman.

Track listing
All songs written by Stevan Birak and Miodrag Krudulj.

Bonus video

Personnel
Vladimir Jezdimirović - vocals
Stevan Birak - guitar
Miodrag Krudulj - bass guitar
Dušan Gnjidić - drums
Zoran Samuilov - keyboard

Additional personnel
Zoran Maletić - producer, arrangements, recorded by
Aleksandra Stojanović - recorded by
Dragoljub "Paja" Bogdanović - cover design

References 

Grad at Discogs

External links
Grad at Discogs

Cactus Jack (band) albums
2002 EPs
Serbian-language albums
One Records (Serbia) EPs